Joseph Thomas Haslam ( – ) was an English rugby union full back who played club rugby for Batley and also represented Yorkshire at county level. Although never selected at international level he was part of the British Isles team who took part in the 1888 New Zealand and Australia tour, the first British overseas tour.

Early life and family
Joseph Thomas Haslam was born in 1863 in Birmingham, which at the time was in Warwickshire. He was christened on 15 March 1863 at St James the Less, Ashted, Warwickshire. He was the son of a joiner, William Haslam and his wife Rose Anne. His mother was from Paisley, Scotland, whilst his father was from Thornhill, West Riding of Yorkshire. Joseph had at least four siblings, an older brother Gerard, two younger sisters Mary Ann and Louisa and a younger brother Charles. By 1881 the family was living in Batley, Yorkshire where Joseph was a warp beamer in a woolen mill.

Rugby career
Haslam represented Batley, first turning out for the senior XV in October 1882 and played to a significantly high level to have also been chosen to play rugby at county level for Yorkshire. In 1888 he was offered a place as part of the British Isles team to tour Australia and New Zealand, signing the contract in January. Although the tour was not recognised by the Rugby Football Union, being set up as a private venture, the game is now retrospectively acknowledged as the very first tour of the British and Irish Lions. Haslam was one of two full backs chosen for the tour along with Swinton's Arthur Paul.

Haslam played his first game for the British Isles against Otago on 28 April 1888, the opening game of the tour. The British Isles won 8-3 but without Haslam on the scoresheet. He missed the second game again Otago, but rejoined the squad to play Canterbury to record his first points of the tour, scoring two of the five British tries in a 14-6 win.

Haslam played in a total of 29 of the 35 matches, scoring a total of 11 tries. On occasion he was also given kicking duties with a single conversion credited to him in the game against an Adelaide XV. He also added a drop goal against Ipswich, a match in which he finished top scorer having also scored a try.

As well as being a key member of the British Isles squad, Haslam is also noted as one of the earliest exponents of the dummy pass, if not the inventor of the technique within the rugby code.

References

External links
Search for "Haslam" at espn.co.uk (1888 British Isles tourists statistics missing (31 December 2017))

1863 births
1896 deaths
Batley Bulldogs players
British & Irish Lions rugby union players from England
English rugby union players
Rugby union fullbacks
Rugby union players from Birmingham, West Midlands